

The MBLE Épervier was a 1970s Belgian battlefield reconnaissance system which included an X-5 air vehicle, a launcher and a drone control centre. It served with the Belgian Army until 1999.

Design and development
Originally the Épervier system was designed to meet a NATO requirement and in July 1969 the Belgian Government decided to fund the development programme, a cooperation contract with Manufacture Belge De Lampes Et De Matériel Electronique (MBLE)(fr, nl) was signed in early 1971. Early prototypes of the drone (designated X-1 to X-4) were flown to prove the concept and at the end of the 1972 in to 1973 the system underwent an operational evaluation, it proved an ability to photograph a target up to 70 km (43 miles) away in either guided or programmed mode.

The X-5 air vehicle is an unmanned monoplane drone powered by a Lucas TJ 125 turbojet, and built under contract by Fairey SA. It has a truncated delta wing with endplate fins and a central fin. The X-5 can carry 70mm day or night cameras and infra-red line-scanning equipment which can transmit real-time data.

The launcher is a short orientable ramp, the drone is recovered by parachute. The Drone Control Centre has all the equipment to for guiding and tracking the air vehicle. The system also has a mobile photographic processing and interpretation unit.

Operational history
Following further evaluation and testing the Épervier entered service with the Belgian Army in 1977 and served until 1999.

Operators

Belgian Army

Specifications (X-5)

See also

References

Notes

Bibliography

1970s Belgian military reconnaissance aircraft
Unmanned aerial vehicles of Belgium